The Scottish Under-25 Championship was a golf tournament for golfers under the age of 25, that was played from 1980 to 1998. In 1980 it was played over 36 holes but later it was a 72-hole stroke-play event on the "Tartan Tour", the PGA in Scotland's schedule.

Winners

The 1980 championship was played over 36 holes.

References

Golf tournaments in Scotland
Recurring sporting events established in 1980
Recurring sporting events disestablished in 1998
1980 establishments in Scotland
1998 disestablishments in Scotland